Dortmund-Marten station is a railway station in the Marten district of the town of Dortmund, located in North Rhine-Westphalia, Germany.

It is classified by Deutsche Bahn as a category 6 station and was opened on 30 May 1964.

Rail services

References

Railway stations in Dortmund